Harunabad (also Romanized as Hārūnābād) is a village in Sofalgaran Rural District, Lalejin District, Bahar County, Hamadan Province, Iran. At the 2006 census, its population was 971, in 192 families.

References 

Populated places in Bahar County